Årslev municipality is a former municipality (Danish, kommune) in the island of Funen in central Denmark. It merged into Faaborg-Midtfyn municipality on 1 January 2007. It belonged to Funen County and its last mayor was Hans Jørgensen, a member of the Social Democrats (Socialdemokraterne) political party.

The main town and the site of its municipal council was the town of Årslev.

Neighboring municipalities were Ullerslev and Langeskov to the east, Odense to the north, Broby to the west, and Ringe and Ørbæk to the south.

Årslev municipality ceased to exist on 1 January 2007 as a result of Kommunalreformen ("The Municipality Reform" of 2007) in which it merged with Broby, Faaborg, Ringe, and Ryslinge municipalities, forming a new Faaborg-Midtfyn municipality. The new municipality belongs to the new Region of Southern Denmark.

External links 
Årslev municipality
 The new Faaborg-Midtfyn municipality's official website (Danish only)

References 
 Municipal statistics: NetBorger Kommunefakta, delivered from KMD aka Kommunedata (Municipal Data)
 Municipal mergers and neighbors: Eniro new municipalities map

Aarslev municipality
Faaborg-Midtfyn Municipality